The 2020–21 Lake Superior State Lakers men's ice hockey season was the 55th season of play for the program, the 48th at the Division I level and the 8th in the WCHA conference. The Lakers represented Lake Superior State University and were coached by Damon Whitten, in his 7th season.

Season
As a result of the ongoing COVID-19 pandemic the entire college ice hockey season was delayed. Because the NCAA had previously announced that all winter sports athletes would retain whatever eligibility they possessed through at least the following year, none of Lake Superior State's players would lose a season of play. However, the NCAA also approved a change in its transfer regulations that would allow players to transfer and play immediately rather than having to sit out a season, as the rules previously required.

After a poor season the year before, Lake Superior saw a great deal of roster turnover. At the start of the season the altered lineup seemed to be performing well; the team lost just once in their first ten games, though the strength of their opposition (or lack thereof) did contribute to their record. Their schedule was part of the reason why the Lakers were ranked 19th when they began conference play and, due to casing the WCHA's top team, they swiftly found themselves outside the top-20. Lake Superior didn't go away, however; the team flirted with the ranking for the remainder of the regular season. The Lakers ended with a much-improved record of 15–6–3, mostly on the strength of senior netminder Mareks Mitens and receiving 170 fewer penalty minutes than the year before (which averaged to about 1 fewer power play against every other game). With both the team's offense and defense playing better than it had in years, the Lakers finished tied for second in the WCHA, the best result for LSSU since 1996.

Even with their record and finish, the Lakers were still ranked outside the top 15 and needed a good performance in the WCHA tournament to get into the conversation. As the second seed, the Lakers began at home against Alabama–Huntsville and dispatched the Chargers fairly easily. In the semifinals, Lake Superior took on Bemidji State with their season on the line and the defense completely shut down the Beavers. Lake State scored the first four goals of the game and Mitens didn't surrender a single goal until 4 minutes remained, even then it only came on a BSU power play with their goalie pulled. The Lakers received a gift by facing 6th-seeded Northern Michigan for the championship. Lake Superior took full advantage by against scoring the first four goals and then coasted to a 6–3 win. it was the program's first conference title since 1995 and the automatic bid allowed the Lakers into the NCAA Tournament for the first time since 1996.

Lake Superior received a 3-seed and were set opposite Massachusetts. Unfortunately, the Minutemen were the hottest team in the country, not having lost a game since mid-January, and it showed from the very start. UMass was the aggressor, scoring first, and despite a tying goal by Lake State at the end of the first the Lakers looked like they were following the play. UMass broke the game open in the second, outshooting LSSU 18–7 and scoring twice to take the lead. The Lakers picked up their game in the third but the oppressive defense by Massachusetts prevented Lake Superior from denting the twine and two more goals against put the game out of reach. Even with poor finish, this season can't be considered anything but a resounding success for the Lakers.

Niko Esposito-Selivanov sat out the season.

Departures

Recruiting

Roster
As of October 14, 2020.

Standings

Schedule and results

|-
!colspan=12 style=";" | Regular season

|-
!colspan=12 style=";" | 

|- align="center" bgcolor="#e0e0e0"
|colspan=12|Lake Superior State Won Series 2–0

|-
!colspan=12 style=";" |

Scoring statistics

Goaltending statistics

Rankings

USCHO did not release a poll in week 20.

Awards and honors

References

Lake Superior State Lakers men's ice hockey seasons
Lake Superior State Lakers
Lake Superior State Lakers
Lake Superior State Lakers
Lake Superior State Lakers
Lake Superior State Lakers